The Drakensberg dwarf chameleon (Bradypodion dracomontanum) occurs in the Drakensberg, South Africa, between the latitudes of 27°45′ and 29°15′. Bright green dwarf chameleons (emerald dwarf chameleon)  found in the Drakensberg south of 29°15′ are now known to be more closely related to the Natal Midlands dwarf chameleon (Bradypodion thamnobates) and may yet be described as a separate species. Picture

References

Bibliography
 Tolley, K. and Burger, M. 2007. Chameleons of Southern Africa. .

External links
 Search for Distribution of Bradypodion dracomontanum

Bradypodion
Reptiles of South Africa
Reptiles described in 1976